She Asked for It is a 1937 American comedy film directed by Erle C. Kenton and written by Frederick J. Jackson and Theodore Reeves. The film stars William Gargan, Orien Heyward, Vivienne Osborne, Richard Carle, Roland Drew, Harry Beresford, and Alan Birmingham. It was released on September 17, 1937, by Paramount Pictures.

Plot

Cast 
William Gargan as Dwight Stanford
Orien Heyward as Penelope Stanford
Vivienne Osborne as Ceila Stettin
Richard Carle as Ted Hoyt
Roland Drew as Randolph Stettin
Harry Beresford as Mr. Switch
Alan Birmingham as Conrad Norris
Harry Fleischmann as Jenkins
Tully Marshall as Old Man Stettin
Miki Morita as Kaito

References

External links 
 

1937 films
Paramount Pictures films
American comedy films
1937 comedy films
Films directed by Erle C. Kenton
American black-and-white films
1930s English-language films
1930s American films